Reginald or Reg Williams may refer to:

 Reginald Williams (MP) (died 1612), English MP for Preston, 1571 and Montgomeryshire, 1593
 Reg Williams (priest) (1914–2012), New Zealand archdeacon
 Reg Williams (rugby league) (fl. 1920s/1930s), Australian footballer
 Skilly Williams (1890–1959), English footballer
 Reg Williams (footballer) (1922–2011), English footballer

See also
Reggie Williams (disambiguation)